DSM or dsm may refer to:

Science and technology
 Deep space maneuver
 Design structure matrix or dependency structure matrix, a representation of a system or project
 Diagnostic and Statistical Manual of Mental Disorders
 DSM-5, the fifth edition of the DSM
 Digital Standard MUMPS, a version of the MUMPS programming language created by Digital Equipment Corporation
 Digital surface model, another term for digital elevation model, used to digitally map topography
 DiskStation Manager, a Linux-based operating system used by Synology
 Distributed shared memory, software and hardware implementations in which each cluster node accesses a large shared memory
 Door status monitor, a device that reads whether a door is open or closed. 
 Dynamic scattering mode, a principle used by the first operational liquid-crystal display
 Dynamic spectrum management, a technique to increase bandwidth over DSL
 Doctor of Medicine, awarded as specialized or surgical medicine (D.SM)

Organisations and economics
 DSM (company), a Dutch multinational life sciences and materials sciences company
 Demand side management, actions that influence energy use by consumers
 Diamond-Star Motors, a former automobile-manufacturing venture
 Doha Securities Market, former name of the Qatar Exchange stock market
 Deutsche Sammlung von Mikroorganismen und Zellkulturen, an organization that collects microorganisms

Politics
 Democratic Socialist Movement (Nigeria), a political organisation in Nigeria
 Democratic Socialist Movement (South Africa), a political organisation in South Africa

Education
 Deutsche Schule Madrid (Colegio Alemán Madrid), a German international school in Madrid, Spain
 Deutsche Schule Montevideo (Colegio Alemán de Montevideo), a German international school in Montevideo, Uruguay
 German School of Milan (Deutsche Schule Mailand), a German international school in Milan, Italy

Other uses
 Des Moines International Airport (IATA code)
 Distinguished Service Medal (disambiguation)
 Deputy Stage Manager, a position in theatre production

See also